The Crown Hills are a group of peaks and hills forming the south-east part of the Lanterman Range in the Bowers Mountains of Victoria Land, Antarctica. The name was given by the New Zealand Antarctic Place-Names Committee in 1983, at the suggestion of geologist M.G. Laird, in association with nearby Coronet Peak. These hills lies situated on the Pennell Coast, a portion of Antarctica lying between Cape Williams and Cape Adare.

References
 

Hills of Victoria Land
Pennell Coast